O Su-yong (born 1944) is a North Korean politician. He was a Vice Chairman of the Workers' Party of Korea (WPK) and the director of the Economic Affairs Department of the WPK.

Biography
O Su-yong was born in 1944. In 1988, he was appointed to the Electronic Automation Industry Committee under the State Administration Council. In September 1998, he became the Vice Minister of Metals and Machine Building Industry. He was then promoted to Minister of Electronic Industry in December 1999.

In April 2009, he resigned as Minister of Electronic Industry and was appointed a Vice Premier of the cabinet. He resigned as Vice Premier in June 2010 and was appointed Chief Secretary of the North Hamgyong Workers' Party of Korea (WPK) Provincial Committee from July of the same year. He was replaced by Jon Sung-hun in 2014.

In September 2010, O was elected to the Central Committee of the WPK.

See also

 Politics of North Korea

References

Living people
1944 births
Date of birth missing (living people)
Place of birth missing (living people)
Government ministers of North Korea
Members of the 8th Politburo of the Workers' Party of Korea
Members of the 8th Central Committee of the Workers' Party of Korea
Vice Chairmen of the Workers' Party of Korea and its predecessors